Leanyer was an electoral division of the Legislative Assembly in Australia's Northern Territory. It existed from 1983 to 1997 (when it was replaced by Drysdale), and was named after the Darwin suburb of Leanyer.

Members for Leanyer

Election results

Elections in the 1980s

Elections in the 1990s

References

Former electoral divisions of the Northern Territory